Paul Anthony Terek (born October 20, 1979 in Dearborn, Michigan) is an American Olympic decathlete. He graduated from Livonia Franklin High School in Livonia, Michigan. His personal best in decathlon is 8312 points, achieved in July 2004 in Sacramento at the United States Olympic Trials. Terek won the bronze medal and was placed on the United States Olympic Team. Out of the ten decathlon events, Terek is strongest in the pole vault, and he is comparatively weak in the 100 m and 400 m sprints.

Terek is also a two-time USA champion in the indoor heptathlon, 2003-4.

In September 2010, Terek became the co-host of Living the Run, a health and fitness radio that airs on ESPN 1280 on the Central Coast of California. Terek and his co-host, Ryan Foran, are health and fitness advocates who are entertaining their fans while interviewing guests and sharing health and fitness tips and news on the weekly radio show.

In 2006, Terek participated in the Japanese televised obstacle course Sasuke, currently syndicated in the United States as Ninja Warrior on the Esquire Network. Terek surpassed most of the other competitors but ultimately failed on the third stage obstacle, the Cliff Hanger, which requires traversal over a water pit with only small fingerholds to keep the competitor from falling into the water. He was by far the heaviest of all the contestants, weighing almost 60 pounds more than most of them (Makoto Nagano, who won the very same tournament, weighed only  at a height of ). It was said that Terek's weight was a factor in him falling from the Cliff Hanger early on. In the fall of 2007, Terek participated once again only to fail on the Jumping Spider obstacle in the first stage. He also helped oversee G4's second American Ninja Challenge prior to the 20th Sasuke competition (although Terek himself did not compete in that tournament). He did return to SASUKE in 2009 for the 22nd tournament, but failed the First Stage again, this time on an obstacle called the Slider Jump. The Slider Jump was again his downfall in the 24th tournament.

Prior to his SASUKE appearance in fall 2007, Terek competed in another Japanese televised show called "Pro Sportsman No.1" where he won the namesake's title.

In October 2010 he announced his retirement from international competition.

Achievements

SASUKE results

17th competition (86): Failed Cliff Hanger - Third Stage
19th competition (98): Failed Jumping Spider - First Stage
22nd competition (98): Failed Slider Jump - First Stage
24th competition (82): Failed Slider Jump - First Stage

References

External links

1979 births
Living people
American male decathletes
Athletes (track and field) at the 2004 Summer Olympics
Olympic track and field athletes of the United States
Sportspeople from Dearborn, Michigan
Sasuke (TV series) contestants